Stan McClain (born July 7, 1961) is an American politician who has served in the Florida House of Representatives from the 23rd district since 2016.  

Representative McClain co-sponsored a bill to require, for high school graduation, credit in United States Government comparative discussion of political ideologies which conflict with the principles of freedom and democracy. 

Representative McClain co-sponsored a bill to repeal the voluntary firearm confiscation provisions of the Marjory Stoneman Douglas School Safety Act.

References

1961 births
Living people
Republican Party members of the Florida House of Representatives
21st-century American politicians